Patrick Raymond Griffith OP, (15 October 1798 – 18 June 1862) was an Irish Dominican priest, who served the Roman Catholic Archdiocese of Cape Town, South Africa. 
Rev. Patrick R. Griffith, who, in 1837 was consecrated the titular Bishop of Paleopolis, in the church of St. Andrew, Westland Row, Dublin where he was administrator, and was sent to Cape Town by Gregory XVI. as the first Vicar Apostolic of Cape Colony. Dr Griffith became the first Catholic bishop in South Africa when the vicariate was elevated to a bishopric.

Dr. Griffith purchased the land on which St. Marys Cathedral built and oversaw its development. Dr. Griffith died on 18 June 1862 in South Africa, and is buried in St. Mary's Cathedral.
Bishop Griffith was succeeded as bishop by another Irishman, Rt. Rev. Dr. Thomas Grimley.

References

1798 births
1862 deaths
19th-century Roman Catholic bishops in South Africa
Dominican bishops
Irish Dominicans
Irish expatriate Catholic bishops
Clergy from County Limerick
Roman Catholic bishops of Cape Town
Roman Catholic bishops of Port Elizabeth